Çekerek is a town and district of Yozgat Province in the Central Anatolia region of Turkey. It is located in northeast of Yozgat province and it is 90 km (56 miles) far from there. According to 2019 census, population of the district is 22,863 of which 9,900 live in the town of Çekerek and remaining 12,963 people live in rural areas.

Notes

References

External links
 District governor's official website 
 General information on Çekerek 

Populated places in Yozgat Province
Districts of Yozgat Province